Sim Hae-in (born 31 October 1987) is a Korean handball player for Busan and the South Korean national team.

She played for the national team at the 2012 Summer Olympics.

References

External links

1987 births
Living people
South Korean female handball players
Handball players at the 2012 Summer Olympics
Handball players at the 2016 Summer Olympics
Handball players at the 2020 Summer Olympics
Asian Games medalists in handball
Handball players at the 2014 Asian Games
Olympic handball players of South Korea
Asian Games gold medalists for South Korea
Handball players from Seoul
Universiade medalists in handball
Medalists at the 2014 Asian Games
Universiade silver medalists for South Korea
South Korean Buddhists
Medalists at the 2015 Summer Universiade
21st-century South Korean women